Papyrus 114, designated by  (in the Gregory-Aland numbering), is a copy of the New Testament in Greek. It is a papyrus manuscript of the Letter to the Hebrews, containing verses 1:7-12 in a fragmentary condition. Using the study of comparative writing styles (palaeography), the manuscript has been dated by the INTF to the 3rd century CE. Papyrologist Philip Comfort dates the manuscript to Middle-Late 3rd century CE. The manuscript is currently housed in the Papyrology Rooms (P. Oxy. 4498) of the Sackler Library at Oxford, United Kingdom.

Description 
The original manuscript would've been around 15cm x 25cm, with 27 lines per page.
There is no extant writing on the opposite side, and so was either blank or contained the Title.
The Greek text of this codex is too small to determine its textual character. The handwriting script is representative of the Reformed Documentary style.

Textual Variants 
1:9
 [ο ] σου ο  (God, your God) : 
 ο  ο  σου (God, your God) :   A B Majority of manuscripts

1:12 
 ως ιματιον
incl. :    A B 1739 vg
omit. : D Ψ 0243 0278 33 1881 K L P Majority of manuscripts lat sy sa bo; Ath.

See also 

 List of New Testament papyri
 Oxyrhynchus Papyri

References

Further reading 

 W. E. H. Cockle, The Oxyrhynchus Papyri LXVI (London: 1999), pp. 9–10.

External links

Images 
 P.Oxy.LXIV 4498 from Papyrology at Oxford's "POxy: Oxyrhynchus Online" 
 Image from 𝔓114 recto, fragment of Hebrews 1:7-12

Official registration 
 "Continuation of the Manuscript List" Institute for New Testament Textual Research, University of Münster. Retrieved April 9, 2008

New Testament papyri
3rd-century biblical manuscripts
Early Greek manuscripts of the New Testament
Epistle to the Hebrews papyri